City Hall Station is a station of the Daejeon Metro Line 1 in Dunsan-dong, Seo District, Daejeon, South Korea.

External links
  City Hall Station from Daejeon Metropolitan Express Transit Corporation
Daejeon Metro stations
Seo District, Daejeon
Railway stations opened in 2006